Joseph Edward Cooper (born September 1, 1957) is a retired American National Basketball Association (NBA) player.  Drafted in the fifth round of the 1981 NBA draft by the New Jersey Nets, Cooper played twenty-four NBA games over the course of three seasons, making appearances for the Nets, the Los Angeles Lakers, the Washington Bullets, the San Diego Clippers and the Seattle SuperSonics.

External links
Joe Cooper at NBA.com

1957 births
Living people
American expatriate basketball people in Argentina
American expatriate basketball people in Israel
American expatriate basketball people in Spain
American men's basketball players
Basketball players from Houston
Boca Juniors basketball players
Centers (basketball)
Colorado Buffaloes men's basketball players
Howard Hawks men's basketball players
Liga ACB players
New Jersey Nets draft picks
New Jersey Nets players
Lancaster Lightning players
Los Angeles Lakers players
San Diego Clippers players
Seattle SuperSonics players
Tulsa Golden Hurricane men's basketball players
Valencia Basket players
Washington Bullets players